Test is a 2014 Russian film about a doomed love triangle, set in 1949 on the prairie of the Kazakh Soviet Socialist Republic in present-day Kazakhstan, near the Semipalatinsk nuclear test site. The film does not have dialogue. The main character, Dina, lives with her father Tolgat on a serene farm that is near a nuclear test site. Dina is gentle, has a strong attachment to nature, and loves art.  She loves to scrapbook and collage with the leaves and sticks.  In one of her scrapbooks she creates a plane flying away representing her dream to one day travel and escape the isolation she feels in the remote farmland.  "Unspecified in the movie itself, the geographical setting can be deduced as somewhere near Semey in modern-day Kazakhstan, then known as Semipalatinsk — notorious as the site of the USSR’s first nuclear test, in August 1949."

Background 
During the time period of 1949 and 1989, Semipalatinsk was used as a testing site for the Soviet Union conducting 456 nuclear tests. One of the first weapons tests took place at this testing site in 1949. A Limited Test Treaty Ban was put into effect in 1963 allowing the use of underground bombing despite the ban on nuclear testing in the atmosphere or in an environment that will possibly lead to radiation. On the bright side, Semipalatinsk testing site was one of the peaceful nuclear testing sites.

Plot, Characters, and Themes 
Dina, a poor farm girl, lives with her father on a remote farm in the middle of present day Kazakhstan but was a part of the Soviet Union when the movie took place in 1949.  Tolgat, Dina's father is a farmer and used to fly planes.  While never stated, it is assumed Tolgat fought in World War II.  Both Dina and Tolgat show little emotion throughout the film. They have experienced trauma and the isolation is brutal.  Tolgat often comes home with such intense sun burns that he is unable to walk.   

Dina also has two love interests. Kaisyn is a local who comes from a similar background to Dina. His relationship with her shows more of a passionate and intense intimacy, while her second love interest with Max represents a more goofy and lighthearted love. Max is blue eyed and Caucasian. He is clearly not from the same area of the Soviet Union and ultimately ends up with Dina in the ends of the movie when a nuclear bomb explodes wiping out Dina's home and everything with it. 

There are many themes that are used in this film in order to implicitly show Dina's emotions. One of these themes is nature and her strong attachment to it. Dina is one with nature as a result of her extreme isolation. The vast farm land of nothingness adds to the feeling of isolation. There is a lack of infrastructure and people, preventing any real interaction with the world besides the characters present in the film. This minimal interaction presented creates more of an urge for Dina's dreams of leaving. She uses it in her artwork to represent her future ambitions of escaping the area she lives in. Her artwork also is an indication of the creativity she develops because she uses the elements of nature in her work to present to viewers her feelings of wanting more without directly speaking on her emotions. Another theme is "actions speak louder than words", as cliche as it sounds. The element of no dialogue drastically adds to the feeling of isolation because viewers are solely left to observe the scenery, objects, and the action of characters. There are many opportunities for viewers to ponder and contemplate on the characters' actions and emotions since there are no conversations. With the absence of dialogue, there is additional work done with the framing distance, lighting, color, camera angles, and editing to assure that viewers think critically about how its mise en scène contributes to telling the story of the film without words adding to the story. Overall, no dialogue adds to the element of loneliness and detachment that may reflect the emptiness of this time period. Another theme is her ambition to travel. There is a large World map in her room that she often gazes at. Dina additionally includes Indian dancing rituals and exotic fish in the collages she makes. Tolgat is also a pilot, so it seems as though travel should be more accessible, which makes her longing to escape more drastic.

Cast 

 Elena An as Dina
 Danila Rassomakhin as Max
 Karim Pakachakov as Tolgat
 Narinman Bekbulatov-Areshev as Kaysin

Reception 
Neil Young of The Hollywood Reporter stated "Elevated by a luminous performance from newcomer Elena An and Levan Kapanadze's crisply poetic cinematography" along with Noémie Luciani's response that "Pictures and sounds are worth (nearly) a thousand words."

Accolades 
The film has won the following awards:
 Narrative Competition, Abu Dhabi Film Festival 2014
 Grand Prize of the Festival, Sochi Open Russian Film Festival 2014
 Best Artistic Contribution Award, Tokyo International Film Festival 2014
 Best International Feature, Golden Orange Film Festival 2014 (Turkey).

References

External links
 

Films directed by Alexander Kott
2014 films
Russian romantic drama films
Films set in Kazakhstan
Films about nuclear war and weapons
Films about the Soviet Union in the Stalin era
Films without speech
2010s historical romance films